Brian McKenzie may refer to:

 Brian McKenzie (basketball) (born 1988), American basketball player
 Brian McKenzie (ice hockey) (born 1951), retired Canadian ice hockey player
 Brian McKenzie (footballer) (born 1947), former Australian rules footballer

See also
 Brian Mackenzie, Baron Mackenzie of Framwellgate (born 1943), British Labour member of the House of Lords